2021 in Japan was largely defined by the COVID-19 pandemic and its impact on the country from one year on, in addition to various other historical events such as the postponement of the 2020 Tokyo Olympics and the economic recovery resulting from the pandemic. However, the pandemic was officially end by the early October 2021, as the country lifted the fourth and final state of emergency up and ahead of the endemic phase.

Incumbents
Emperor: Naruhito
Prime Minister: Yoshihide Suga (until October 4), Fumio Kishida (from October 4)
Chief Cabinet Secretary: Katsunobu Katō (until October 4), Hirokazu Matsuno (from October 4)
Chief Justice of Japan: Naoto Ōtani
Speaker of the House of Representatives: Tadamori Ōshima
President of the House of Councillors: Akiko Santō

Governors
Aichi Prefecture: Hideaki Omura
Akita Prefecture: Norihisa Satake
Aomori Prefecture: Shingo Mimura
Chiba Prefecture: Toshihito Kumagai
Ehime Prefecture: Tokihiro Nakamura
Fukui Prefecture: Tatsuji Sugimoto
Fukuoka Prefecture: Seitaro Hattori
Fukushima Prefecture: Masao Uchibori
Gifu Prefecture: Hajime Furuta
Gunma Prefecture: Ichita Yamamoto
Hiroshima Prefecture: Hidehiko Yuzaki
Hokkaido: Naomichi Suzuki
Hyogo Prefecture: Motohiko Saitō
Ibaraki Prefecture: Kazuhiko Ōigawa
Ishikawa: Masanori Tanimoto
Iwate Prefecture: Takuya Tasso
Kagawa Prefecture: Keizō Hamada
Kagoshima Prefecture: Kōichi Shiota
Kanagawa Prefecture: Yuji Kuroiwa
Kumamoto Prefecture: Ikuo Kabashima
Kochi Prefecture: Seiji Hamada
Kyoto Prefecture: Takatoshi Nishiwaki
Mie Prefecture: Eikei Suzuki
Miyagi Prefecture: Yoshihiro Murai
Miyazaki Prefecture: Shunji Kōno
Nagano Prefecture: Shuichi Abe
Nagasaki Prefecture: Hōdō Nakamura 
Nara Prefecture: Shōgo Arai
Niigata Prefecture: Hideyo Hanazumi
Oita Prefecture: Katsusada Hirose
Okayama Prefecture: Ryuta Ibaragi
Okinawa Prefecture: Denny Tamaki
Osaka Prefecture: Ichirō Matsui
Saga Prefecture: Yoshinori Yamaguchi
Saitama Prefecture: Motohiro Ōno
Shiga Prefecture: Taizō Mikazuki
Shiname Prefecture: Tatsuya Maruyama
Shizuoka Prefecture: Heita Kawakatsu
Tochigi Prefecture: Tomikazu Fukuda
Tokushima Prefecture: Kamon Iizumi
Tokyo Prefecture: Yuriko Koike
Tottori Prefecture: Shinji Hirai
Toyama Prefecture: Hachiro Nitta
Wakayama Prefecture: Yoshinobu Nisaka
Yamagata Prefecture: Mieko Yoshimura
Yamaguchi Prefecture: Tsugumasa Muraoka
Yamanashi Prefecture: Kotaro Nagasaki

Ongoing events
 COVID-19 pandemic in Japan
 Japan–South Korea trade dispute

Events by month

January
 January 1 – Emperor Naruhito and Prime Minister Yoshihide Suga delivered 2021 New Year's message to bring the COVID-19 under control and pledged to host the postponed 2020 Summer Olympics.
 January 2
 The governors of Tokyo and three neighboring prefectures considered to declare another state of emergency over COVID-19 resurgence, Economic Revitalization Minister Yasutoshi Nishimura who in charge of COVID-19 response.
 The world's oldest person, Kane Tanaka celebrated her 118th birthday in southwestern Japan on Saturday.
 January 4
 The Nikkei 225 in Tokyo was off 0.4% at 27,344.87 after Prime Minister Yoshihide Suga announced the government is considering declaring a state of emergency for Tokyo and three surrounding prefectures due to surging virus caseloads.
 The government considered declaring a nationwide state of emergency over COVID-19 resurgence, the countdown clock for the postponed Tokyo Olympics hit 200 days to go.
 January 5
 Prime Minister Yoshihide Suga to declare another state of emergency in Tokyo and three neighboring prefectures as the COVID-19 resurgence on Thursday, while the government reported more than 4,900 cases.
 New car sales in Japan slumped 11.5% in 2020 from a year earlier amid the pandemic, marking the largest fall in nine years, data from industry bodies showed Tuesday. While tuna gone cut price ¥20 million at Tokyo's Toyosu Market during New Year auction.
 The Constitutional Democrats, Social Democrats, and the Communists prepared to form a pacifist coalition, despite to the anti-Suga Cabinet protests and riots. After the Japanese government warned about a new national lockdown in the European Union and the United Kingdom.

February
 February 13 – 2021 Fukushima earthquake

March
  March 11 – The 10th anniversary of the 2011 Tohoku earthquake and tsunami.
  March 20 - March 2021 Miyagi earthquake
  March 25 – The 2020 Summer Olympics torch relay restarted in Fukushima Prefecture.

April
 April 13 – The decision to dump radioactive water of the Fukushima nuclear plant into the Pacific Ocean over the course of 30 years finally obtains the approval of the Japanese cabinet.
 April 19 – Rockfish in Fukushima is banned from export after detecting caesium over legal limit, likely caused by the discharge of radioactive water of the Fukushima Nuclear Plant. This is the first ban since the lifting of ban on all Fukushima fish in February 2020.

May
 May 1 – A F2 scale tornado hit houses, building, utility polls and tea plantations in Makinohara, Shizuoka Prefecture. According to a local government official confirmed report, three persons were lightly injured and 102 houses and buildings were damaged.
 May 27 – According to a Japan Coast Guard official confirmed report, a chemical tanker Ulsan Pioneer and cargo ship Byakko (白虎) collided in Kurushima strait, Seto Island Sea, Ehime Prefecture.  Nine persons were rescued, and there were three fatalities.

June

July
July 3 – 2021 Atami landslide
July 23 – 2020 Summer Olympics: The 2020 Summer Olympics opening ceremony takes place at the Japan National Stadium.

August
August 6 – According to a Japan National Police Agency report, a thirty-six years old suspect attacked passengers with a knife on a commuter train on Odakyu Line, Setagaya, Tokyo. He was detained by local police on the same day and 10 passengers were wounded. It is considered a terrorist attack. 
August 11 to 17 – 2021 August Japan flood, a torrential  massive rain and flash flood hit Saga, Kyushu Island, and caused a landslide to hit around Kyushu, Honshu, resulting in 12 deaths and 16 injuries, according to a Japan Fire and Disaster Management Agency official confirmed report.
August 12 – The 2020 Summer Paralympics torch relay started nationwide.
August 13 – According to Japan Meteorological Agency official confirmed report, a largest volcano eruption hit in Fukutoku-Okanoba, Bonin Islands. According to Japan National Institute of Advanced Industrial and Science general manager Kazuhiro Ishimura said on 23 October, the volcano ash height estimate on 16,000 to 19,000 meters (52,493 to 62,335 foot) and 100 million cubic square  meters ash volume, second largest volume ash eruption in territory of Japan's history.  
August 24 
 Senior member of the Yakuza, Satoru Nomura, is sentenced to death in Fukuoka, for ordering four assaults, one of which was deadly. Nomura has denied participating in the crimes. It is the first time that a senior member of Japan's Yakuza has been sentenced to death. (BBC)
 The 2020 Summer Paralympics opening ceremony takes place at the Japan National Stadium.

September
September 1 – The Digital Agency is launched to speed up digitalisation of governmental services.
September 3 – Prime Minister Suga announced he will not stand in the 2021 Liberal Democratic Party (Japan) leadership election.
September 26 – According to Japan Meteorological Agency official confirmed report, a height of 5,400 meters (17,700 foot) eruption records on Suwanosejima, Tokara Islands, Kagoshima Prefecture, where highest height of observation history.
September 29 – Fumio Kishida, the foreign minister of outgoing Prime Minister Yoshihide Suga, is elected the Liberal Democratic Party's new president, paving the way for him to be Japan's next leader.

October
October 1 – Japan becoming the first country who transition to the endemic phase.
October 3 – According to Wakayama mayor Masahiro Obana, a Musota Waterpipe Bridge suddenly severely deteriorated and damaged across Kino River, where 138,000 persons (60,000 households) suspend supply and not be possible to resume water supply function of the aqueduct and resident until December 2021.   
October 4 – Fumio Kishida becomes Japan's 100th Prime Minister, with a new Cabinet mostly made up of newcomers formed. Elections for the House of Representatives will also be held on October 31.
October 7 – According to USGS report, a Richer Scale 5.9 earthquake hit around Tokyo Metropolitan Area, according to Japan Fire and Disaster Management Agency official confirmed report, 47 persons were wounded, due affective moderate quake.
October 22 – Princess Mako celebrates her last royal birthday, before turning bourgeois out of love.
October 31 – According to Japan National Police Agency official confirmed report, A twenty-four years old suspected to knife attack to passengers and arson, during run to Hachioji bound commuter train, Keio Line, Chofu, Tokyo, total 17 passengers injures.

November
November 1 – A popular idol group, V6 disbands.

December
December 17 – 2021 Osaka building fire
December 21 – Three death-row inmates were hanged, first executions taken place in 2 years.
December 25 – A first dual-mode vehicle service, Awa-Kainan Station to Cape Muroto, via Kannoura Station, Asatō Line, Shikoku Island, for regular operation start in the world during the Christmas period, according to Awa Searide Railway official confirmed report.

The Nobel Prize
 Syukuro Manabe: 2021 Nobel Prize in Physics winner.

Arts and entertainment
2021 in anime
2021 in Japanese music
2021 in Japanese television
List of 2021 box office number-one films in Japan
List of Japanese films of 2021

Sports
 2020 Summer Olympics (Japan)

 2021 F4 Japanese Championship
 2021 Super Formula Championship
 2021 Super Formula Lights
 2021 Super GT Series

 2021 in Japanese football
 2021 J1 League
 2021 J2 League
 2021 J3 League
 2021 Japan Football League
 2021 Japanese Regional Leagues
 2021 Japanese Super Cup
 2021 Emperor's Cup
 2021 J.League Cup

Deaths

January
January 1 – Seizō Fukumoto, actor (b. 1943)
January 29 – Tochinoumi Teruyoshi, sumo wrestler (b. 1938)

February
February 8 – Shūichirō Moriyama, actor (b. 1934)
February 17 – Tetsurō Sagawa, actor (b. 1937)
February 25 – Masako Sugaya, voice actress (b. 1937)

March
March 1 – Kirinji Kazuharu, sumo wrestler (b. 1953)
March 15 – Yasuo Ōtsuka, animator (b. 1931)
March 24
Toshihiko Koga, judoka (b. 1967)
Kunie Tanaka, actor (b. 1932)

April
April 1 – Isamu Akasaki, engineer (b. 1929)
April 3 – Masakazu Tamura, actor (b. 1943)
April 4 – Sugako Hashida, screen writer (b. 1925)
April 11 – Daisuke Ryu, actor (b. 1957)
April 17 – Osamu Kobayashi, illustrator (b. 1964)
April 24 – Shunsuke Kikuchi, composer (b. 1931)
April 25 – Toshiro Kandagawa, chef (b. 1939)
April 30 – Takashi Tachibana, journalist (b. 1940)

May
May 6 – Kentaro Miura, manga artist (b. 1966)
May 30 – Asei Kobayashi, composer (b. 1932)

June
June 6 – Ei-ichi Negishi, chemist
June 18 – Takeshi Terauchi, guitarist (b. 1939)
June 21 – Nobuo Hara, jazz saxophonist (b. 1926)
June 30 – Yasunori Oshima, baseball player (b. 1950)

July
July 2 – Kōbō Kenichi, sumo wrestler (b. 1973)
July 22 – Zentaro Watanabe, musician (b. 1963) 
July 23 – Toshihide Maskawa, theoretical physicist (b. 1940)
July 28 – Satsuki Eda, politician (b. 1941)
July 31 - Sanpei Satō, cartoonist (b. 1929)

August
August 2 – Hideki Hosaka, professional wrestler (b. 1971)
August 3 – Yūsuke Kinoshita, baseball player (b. 1993)
August 14 – Jerry Fujio, singer (b. 1940)
August 16 – Hiroshi Sakagami, author (b. 1936)
August 19 – Sonny Chiba, actor (b. 1939)

September
September 3 – Shinichiro Sawai, film director (b. 1938)
September 17 – Wataru Takeshita, politician (b. 1946)
September 24 – Takao Saito, manga artist (b. 1936)
September 30 – Koichi Sugiyama, composer (b. 1931)

October
October 12 – Chie Nakane, anthropologist (b. 1927)
October 14 – Mayumi Moriyama, politician and former Chief Cabinet Secretary (b. 1927)
October 17
 Toshihiro Iijima, television producer (b. 1932)
 Gorō Maeda, comedian(b. 1942)

November
November 3 – Yasuro Kikuchi, go player (b. 1929)
November 4 – Tatsuhiko Kawashima, the father of princess Kawashima Kiko (b. 1940). 
November 8 – Kazuko Hosoki, fortune teller (b. 1938)
November 9 – Jakucho Setouchi, Buddhist nun (b. 1922)
November 12 – Takeshi Koba, baseball player (b. 1936)
November 13 – Emi Wada, costume designer (b. 1937)
November 28 – Nakamura Kichiemon II,  kabuki actor (b. 1944)

December
December 3 – Jōji Yanami, voice actor (b. 1931)
December 8 – Mitsutoshi Furuya, manga artist (b. 1936)
December 18 – Sayaka Kanda, actress and singer (b. 1986)

See also

Country overviews

 Japan
 History of Japan
 Outline of Japan
 Government of Japan
 Politics of Japan
 Years in Japan
 Timeline of Japanese history

Related timelines for current period

 2021
 2020s
2020s in political history

References

External links
 

 
2020s in Japan
Years of the 21st century in Japan
Japan
Japan